Apis lithohermaea, also known as giant honey bee (not confused with extent Apis dorsata common name) is an extinct species of honey bee in the dorsata species group. It is the largest fossil honey bee and one of the biggest honey bees ever discovered, rivaling in size the modern Apis dorsata and could matching as well, and is the first recorded fossil of the dorsata species group. Although the dorsata group does not occur further north than Tibet, south than southern China and Philippines. 

The type fossil specimen of A. lithohermaea was collected from Iki Island, Japan.

In culture

ARK: Survival Evolved
In September 2016, the "Giant Bee" animal was added to ARK: Survival Evolved, themed after the species. There are two types in the game, drones and the queen.

References 

lithohermaea
Extinct insects
Miocene genus extinctions